Maa Markama Temple located at Bissam Cuttack village of Rayagada district is a place of tourist interest. It is the only shrine (Shakti Peethas) of Devi Maa Markama and Maa karkama in the Indian state of Odisha. The temple of Maa Karkama (believed to be the sister of Maa Markama) is situated next to the temple of Maa Markama. The legend says that the Devi is being worshiped for centuries. However, the temple was constructed in the recent past. 
A junior college and a university college in Bissam Cuttack are named after Maa Markama. The temple is one of the places of tourist attractions in Rayagada district.  Dussehra and chaitra Paraba are celebrated every year at the temple. The nearest rail head is Chatikona, which is 7 km (4.34 miles) from Bissam Cuttack.

History

As per historical references,  Kalahambir, the king of SURYA dynasty (Suryavansi) ruled Bissam cuttack and Devi Maa Markama was the Ishtadevi of the royal family. The ritual of human sacrifice was prevalent here and was stopped during the British rule. Yet the ritual of buffalo sacrifice continued, which was stopped by the then Regional officer Shri Gadhadhar Mishro(01.07.1953-19.03.1955). The mention of Devi Maa Markama can also be found in the CHANDI PURANA of Sarala Dash and also in BATA ABAKASH of Matta Balarama Dash. The Devi has been mentioned as Utkaleeya (Oriya for "of Odisha") jogini in mythological books. Several legends say that Devi Markama helped the King of Bissam Cuttack during a war by mesmerizing the enemy soldiers.

References

Devi temples in India
Hindu temples in Rayagada district